The 2022–23 UEFA Nations League C is the third division of the 2022–23 edition of the UEFA Nations League, the third season of the international football competition involving the men's national teams of the 55 member associations of UEFA.

Format
League C consists of 16 UEFA members ranked from 33–48 in the 2022–23 UEFA Nations League access list, split into four groups of four. Each team played six matches within their group, using the home-and-away round-robin format in June (quadruple matchdays) and September 2022 (double matchdays). The winners of each group were promoted to the 2024–25 UEFA Nations League B, and the fourth-placed team of each group advanced to the relegation play-outs.

As League C has four groups while League D has only two, the two League C teams that are to be relegated to the 2024–25 UEFA Nations League D will be determined by play-outs in March 2024. Based on the Nations League overall ranking, the best-ranked team will face the fourth-ranked team, and the second-ranked team will face the third-ranked team. Two ties will be played over two legs, with each team playing one leg at home (the higher-ranked team will host the second leg). The team that scores more goals on aggregate over the two legs will remain in League C, while the loser will be relegated to League D. If the aggregate score is level, extra time will be played (the away goals rule is not applied). If still tied after extra time, a penalty shoot-out will be used to decide the winner.

Teams

Team changes
The following are the team changes of League C from the 2020–21 season:

Seeding
In the 2022–23 access list, UEFA ranked teams based on the 2020–21 Nations League overall ranking. The seeding pots for the league phase were confirmed on 22 September 2021, and were based on the access list ranking.

The draw for the league phase took place at the UEFA headquarters in Nyon, Switzerland on 16 December 2021, 18:00 CET. Each group contained one team from each pot. Due to restrictions of excessive travel, any group could contain a maximum of one of the following pairs: Northern Ireland and Kazakhstan, Gibraltar and Azerbaijan.

Groups
The fixture list was confirmed by UEFA on 17 December 2021, the day following the draw.

Times are CEST (UTC+2), as listed by UEFA (local times, if different, are in parentheses).

Group 1

Group 2

Group 3

Group 4

Relegation play-outs
The fourth-placed teams of League C will participate in the relegation play-outs to determine the two teams which will be relegated. The relegation play-outs are scheduled on the same dates as the UEFA Euro 2024 qualifying play-offs. If at least one of the teams due to participate in the relegation play-outs also qualifies for the Euro qualifying play-offs, the relegation play-outs will be cancelled, and the teams in League C ranked 47th and 48th in the Nations League overall ranking will be automatically relegated.

The play-out ties are as follows, with the higher-ranked teams hosting the second leg:
Team ranked first vs. team ranked fourth
Team ranked second vs. team ranked third

Times are CET (UTC+1), as listed by UEFA (local times, if different, are in parentheses).

Ranking

Summary

|}

Matches

Goalscorers

Overall ranking
The 16 League C teams will be ranked 33rd to 48th overall in the 2022–23 UEFA Nations League according to the following rules:
The teams finishing first in the groups will be ranked 33rd to 36th according to the results of the league phase.
The teams finishing second in the groups will be ranked 37th to 40th according to the results of the league phase.
The teams finishing third in the groups will be ranked 41st to 44th according to the results of the league phase.
The teams finishing fourth in the groups will be ranked 45th to 48th according to the results of the league phase.

Euro 2024 qualifying play-offs

The four best teams in League C according to the overall ranking that do not qualify for UEFA Euro 2024 through the qualifying group stage will compete in the play-offs, with the winners qualifying for the final tournament.

Key
GW Group winner from Nations League A, B or C
 Team is assured at least a play-off spot based on Nations League ranking, but may still qualify directly

Notes

References

External links

League C